The 2003 Jelajah Malaysia, a cycling stage race that took place in Malaysia. It was held from 6 to 15 October 2003. There were ten stages. In fact, the race was sanctioned by the Union Cycliste Internationale as a 2.2 category race.

Hidenori Nodera of Japan won the race, followed by Wawan Setyobudi of Indonesia second overall.

Stages

Final standings

General classification

External links
 
 Palmares at cyclingarchives.com

Jelajah Malaysia
Jelajah Malaysia
Jelajah Malaysia